Highbank is an unincorporated community in southern Falls County, Texas, United States. It lies located along Farm to Market Road 413, just east of the Brazos River.

Unincorporated communities in Texas
Unincorporated communities in Falls County, Texas